Young was an electoral district for the Legislative Assembly in the Australian state of New South Wales, named after and including the town of Young. It elected two members between 1880 and 1894 and one member from 1894 to 1904, when it was replaced by Burrangong. The sitting member George Burgess successfully contested Burrangong. In 1920, with the introduction of proportional representation, Burrangong was absorbed by the three member district of Cootamundra. Proportional representation was abandoned in 1927 and Young was recreated. It was abolished in 1981 and the district was split with Young being absorbed by Burrinjuck while the towns of Cowra and Forbes were absorbed by a re-created Lachlan.

Members for Young

Election results

References

Former electoral districts of New South Wales
Constituencies established in 1880
1880 establishments in Australia
Constituencies disestablished in 1894
1894 disestablishments in Australia
Constituencies established in 1927
1927 establishments in Australia
Constituencies disestablished in 1981
1981 disestablishments in Australia